That Mothers Might Live is a 1938 American short drama film directed by Fred Zinnemann. In 1939, at the 11th Academy Awards, it won an Oscar for Best Short Subject (One-Reel).

The short is a brief account of Hungarian physician Ignaz Semmelweis and his discovery of the need for cleanliness in 19th-century maternity wards, thereby significantly decreasing maternal mortality, and of his struggle to gain acceptance of his idea. Although Semmelweis ultimately failed in his lifetime, later scientific luminaries advanced his work in spirit like microbiologist Louis Pasteur, who provided a scientific theoretical explanation of Semmelweis' observations by helping develop the germ theory of disease and the British surgeon, Dr. Joseph Lister who revolutionized medicine putting Pasteur's research to practical use.

Cast
 Shepperd Strudwick as Dr. Ignaz Semmelweis (as Sheppard Strudwick)
 John Nesbitt as Narrator (voice)

References

External links

1938 films
1938 drama films
1938 short films
American drama short films
American black-and-white films
Biographical films about physicians
Biographical films about scientists
Films directed by Fred Zinnemann
Live Action Short Film Academy Award winners
Metro-Goldwyn-Mayer short films
1930s English-language films
1930s American films